Dungannon Greyhound Stadium or Oaks Park was a greyhound racing track held on Oaks Road, Dungannon, County Tyrone,  BT71 4BA, Northern Ireland.

History
Dungannon became the third Northern Irish greyhound track behind Celtic Park and Dunmore Stadium in July 1930. Being a greyhound track in Northern Ireland it was neither under the jurisdiction of the National Greyhound Racing Club which was the governing body for UK Tracks or the Bord na gCon (the Irish Greyhound Board) which is the governing body for Irish tracks, the latter did however publish the results for Northern Ireland.

The track was 485 yards in circumference and racing took place every Tuesday or Wednesday, Thursday and Saturday evening and used an Outside Sumner hare system.

The Ulster Oaks was introduced in 1970 establishing itself as the main event run at the track. Other competitions of note were the Mick Horan Puppy Championship (Horan was Mick the Miller's first trainer), the Tuborg Viceroy Cup and the Harry McCrory Memorial Cup (McCrory had a 30-year association with the track).

In 1962 Tommy McCombe became the General and Racing Manager after Clones closed.

In 1990 a fire destroyed a large part of the main stand around the same time that a letter was sent to the Bord na gCon threatening further attacks on the racecourse unless they stopped supporting coursing clubs.

Closure
The Dungannon (Oaks Park) Stadium Greyhound Racing Limited who had taken over the track in 1995 saw the opportunity to make a substantial profit by developing the site and the track closed down in 2003. It was not until 2011 that planning permission was granted for 120 mixed residential dwellings, with a Sainsbury's shopping centre to the West and Dunlea Vale directly to the North. In 2014 the derelict grandstand was subject to an arson attack and completely destroyed.

Track records

Ulster Oaks Winners
1971 Kilwoney Rose
1972 Trace of Red
1973 Ashling Ban
1974 Rokeel Rebel
1975 Bright Evening
1976 Kisses For Me
1998 Toumpane Valley
1999 Rosalettos Girl
2000 Tullymurry Tango
2001 Shanless Park
2002 Baltic Star

References

Greyhound racing in Ireland